The 2014 Open GDF Suez de Biarritz is a professional tennis tournament played on outdoor clay courts. It is the twelfth edition of the tournament which is part of the 2014 ITF Women's Circuit, offering a total of $100,000 in prize money. It takes place in Biarritz, France, on 7–13 July 2014.

Singles main draw entrants

Seeds 

 1 Rankings as of 23 June 2014

Other entrants 
The following players received wildcards into the singles main draw:
  Manon Arcangioli
  Fiona Ferro
  Chloé Paquet
  Jessika Ponchet

The following players received entry from the qualifying draw:
  Audrey Albié
  Martina Caregaro
  Inés Ferrer Suárez
  Gaia Sanesi

The following players received entry by a lucky loser spot:
  Amanda Carreras
  Viktoriya Tomova

The following players received entry with a protected ranking:
  Akgul Amanmuradova
  Evgeniya Rodina
  Ana Savić

Champions

Singles 

  Kaia Kanepi def.  Teliana Pereira 6–2, 6–4

Doubles 

  Florencia Molinero /  Stephanie Vogt def.  Lourdes Domínguez Lino /  Teliana Pereira 6–2, 6–2

External links 
 2014 Open GDF Suez de Biarritz at ITFtennis.com
 Official website 

Biarritz
Open de Biarritz
2014 in French tennis
July 2014 sports events in France